Jean-Antoine Houdon (20 March 1741 – 15 July 1828) was a French neoclassical sculptor.

Houdon is famous for his portrait busts and statues of philosophers, inventors and political figures of the Enlightenment. Houdon's subjects included Denis Diderot (1771), Benjamin Franklin (1778-1809), Jean-Jacques Rousseau (1778), Voltaire (1781), Molière (1781), George Washington (1785–1788), Thomas Jefferson (1789), Louis XVI (1790), Robert Fulton (1803–04), and Napoléon Bonaparte (1806).

Biography

Houdon was born in Versailles, on 20 March 1741.
In 1752, he entered the Académie royale de peinture et de sculpture, where he studied with René-Michel Slodtz, Jean-Baptiste Lemoyne, and Jean-Baptiste Pigalle. From 1761 to 1764, he studied at the École royale des élèves protégés.

Houdon won the Prix de Rome in 1761, but was not greatly influenced by ancient and Renaissance art in Rome. His stay in the city is marked by two characteristic and important productions: the superb écorché (1767), an anatomical model which has served as a guide to all artists since his day, and the statue of Saint Bruno in the church of Santa Maria degli Angeli e dei Martiri in Rome. 
After four years in Italy, Houdon returned to Paris.

He submitted Morpheus to the Salon of 1771. He developed his practise of portrait busts.
He became a member of the Académie de peinture et de sculpture in 1771, and a professor in 1778. In 1778, he modeled Voltaire, producing a portrait bust with wig for the Comédie-Française; one for the Palace of Versailles, and one for Catherine the Great.

In 1778, he joined the masonic lodge Les Neuf Sœurs, where he later met Benjamin Franklin, and John Paul Jones.
For Salon of 1781, he submitted a Diana which was refused without drapery.

Houdon's portrait sculpture of Washington was the result of a specific invitation by Benjamin Franklin to cross the Atlantic in 1785, specifically to visit Mount Vernon, so that Washington could model for him. Washington sat for wet clay life models and a plaster life mask. 
These models served for many commissions of Washington, including the standing figure commissioned by the Virginia General Assembly, for the Virginia State Capitol in Richmond. 
Numerous variations of the Washington bust were produced, portraying him variously as a general in uniform, in the classical manner showing chest musculature, and as Roman Consul Lucius Quinctius Cincinnatus clad in a toga. A cast of the latter is located in the Vermont State House.

In the 1780s Houdon produced two semi-nude sculptures, Winter and Bather.

Perceived as bourgeois for his connections to the court of Louis XVI, he fell out of favour during the French Revolution, although he escaped imprisonment. 
Houdon returned to favor during the French Consulate and Empire, being taken on as one of the original artistic team for what became the Column of the Grande Armée at Wimille.
He was made a Chevalier de la Légion d'honneur, on 17 December 1804.Houdon died in Paris on 15 July 1828, and was interred at the Montparnasse Cemetery.

Family
On 1 July 1786, he married Marie-Ange-Cecile Langlois; they had three daughters: Sabine, Anne-Ange, and Claudine.

Legacy and influence
Houdon's sculptures were used as models for the engravings used on various U.S. postage stamps of the late 19th and early 20th centuries which depict Washington in profile.

Gallery

See also
 Neoclassicism in France
 Washington-Franklin Issues

Notes

References
 
  
 
  
 
 ; Kessinger Publishing, 2006,

External links

 Virtual Gallery
 Jean-Antoine Houdon (1741–1828) (Heilbrunn Timeline of Art History)
 Art and the empire city: New York, 1825–1861, an exhibition catalog from The Metropolitan Museum of Art (fully available online as PDF), which contains material on Houdon (see index)
 

1741 births
1828 deaths
People from Versailles
18th-century French sculptors
French male sculptors
19th-century French sculptors
Members of the Académie des beaux-arts
Prix de Rome for sculpture
People of the French Revolution
Les Neuf Sœurs
French Freemasons
Burials at Montparnasse Cemetery
19th-century French male artists
18th-century French male artists